Pymatuning Valley School District is a public district in Andover, Ohio.

History

The Pymatuning Valley School District was created in 1960 in Andover, Ohio when the school districts in Andover, Richmond Township, Williamsfield and New Lyme Deming merged into one district. Its mascot has been the "Lakers", a reference to the proximity of Pymatuning Reservoir.

Administration

The Pymatuning Valley Administrative offices are located near the primary school on Route 6 in Ohio.

PV Board of Education District Goals

Students in the Pymatuning Valley Local School District will achieve a 95% attendance rate as measured by the state report card 100% of the students in the Pymatuning Valley Local School District will be proficient or higher on the OAT/OGT.

Schools

Elementary

Pymatuning Valley Primary School
Houses preschool-4th grade

Middle

Pymatuning Valley Middle School
Houses 5th-8th grades

Secondary

Pymatuning Valley High School
Houses 9th-12th grades

References

External links
 

School districts in Ohio
Education in Ashtabula County, Ohio
School districts established in 1960